Slaughter may refer to:

Animals
 Animal slaughter, the killing of animals for various purposes
 Ritual slaughter, the practice of slaughtering livestock in a ritual manner
 Dhabihah, the prescribed method of ritual slaughter of animals excluding camels, locusts, fish and most sea life in Islamic law
 Shechita, the ritual slaughter of mammals and birds according to Jewish dietary laws

Murder
 Murder
 Manslaughter
 Massacre
 Mass murder

People
 Slaughter (surname)
 Sgt. Slaughter (born 1948), stage name of Robert Rudolph Remus, a pro wrestler

Places
 Lower Slaughter, in Gloucestershire, England
 Upper Slaughter, also in Gloucestershire
 Slaughter, Louisiana, United States
 Slaughter, Washington, United States renamed Auburn, Washington February 21, 1893
 Slaughter Lane, a former name of Brewer Street, Oxford, England

Entertainment

Film
 Slaughter (1972 film), a 1972 film starring Jim Brown and Stella Stevens
 Snuff (film), originally titled Slaughter in 1972, retitled for its wider 1976 release
 Slaughter (2009 film), a 2009 film from After Dark Films

Music 
 Slaughter (band), an American hard rock band
 Slaughter (Canadian band), a Canadian thrash metal band
 "Slaughter" (song), Billy Preston's theme song to the 1972 film of the same name
 Slaughter (album), a 2015 album by Young Wicked
 The Slaughter, an album by American heavy metal band Incite
 Slaughter & the Dogs, a British punk band
 Slaughterhouse (group), an American hip hop group

Other
 Chicago Slaughter, professional indoor football team
 Slaughter and May, a City of London law firm
 Slátur, an Icelandic food like haggis or blood pudding

See also
 Bloodbath (disambiguation)
 Butchering
 Slaughterhouse, a facility where animals are slaughtered